Confidence is the third LP released by the Reggae artist Gentleman.

Track listing 
 "Send a Prayer" - 3:50
 "Superior" - 3:45
 "Caan Hold Us Down" (featuring Barrington Levy, Daddy Rings) - 3:23
 "Intoxication" - 4:13
 "New Day" - 3:34
 "Be Yourself" (featuring Cocoa Tea) - 3:48
 "All That You Had" - 3:54
 "Life Takes More Than That" - 3:02
 "Rumours" - 3:18
 "Weary No More" (featuring Tamika) - 3:38
 "After a Storm" - 4:21
 "Unconditional Love" - 4:02
 "Face off" (featuring Anthony B) - 4:22
 "Strange Things" - 4:07
 "Blessing of Jah" (featuring Ras Shiloh) - 3:48
 "Church and State" - 3:38
 "Lion's Den" - 3:52
 "Mystic Wind" (featuring Tony Rebel) - 3:50
 "For the Children" - 3:16
 "No Time Like Now" (featuring Jack Radics) - 3:23

References

Confidence
Confidence